Fenestration may refer to:

 Fenestration (architecture), the design, construction, or presence of openings in a building
 Used in relation to fenestra in anatomy, medicine and biology
 Fenestration, holes in the rudder of a ship to reduce the work required to move it while preserving its ability to steer

See also 
 Defenestration, the act of throwing someone or something out of a window
 National Fenestration Rating Council, an organization which measures and compares the energy performance of fenestration products